Zeiss or Zeiß may refer to:

People
Carl Zeiss (1816–1888), German optician and entrepreneur
Emil Zeiß (1833–1910), German Protestant minister and painter

Companies
Carl Zeiss AG, German manufacturer of optics, industrial measurements and medical devices founded by Carl Zeiss
Carl Zeiss Foundation, holding company for several Zeiss companies
Carl Zeiss Meditec AG, a Zeiss subsidiary
Carl Zeiss SMT, a Zeiss subsidiary
Schott AG, a Zeiss subsidiary

Institutions and organizations
Carl-Zeiss-Gymnasium Jena a School in Jena, Germany.
FC Carl Zeiss Jena, football club founded in 1903 by workers at Carl Zeiss optics company

Technologies
Zeiss formula, a formula for depth of field calculations.
Zeiss projector, a line of planetarium projectors manufactured by one of the Zeiss companies
Zeiss Planar, a photographic lens patented by the Zeiss company in 1896
Zeiss Sonnar, a photographic lens patented by the Zeiss company in 1924
Zeiss Tessar, a photographic lens patented by the Zeiss company in 1902

Other uses
851 Zeissia, an S-type asteroid named for Carl Zeiss
Zeiss (comics), DC Comics villain

See also
Zeis (disambiguation)